A plea colloquy, in United States criminal procedure, is a conversation between a judge and a criminal defendant who has been sworn under oath, which must occur when the defendant enters a guilty plea in court in order for the plea to be valid. The United States Supreme Court has crafted a doctrine which requires the court to engage in a specific line of inquiry. Because a guilty plea must be made intelligently, knowingly, and voluntarily, the court must advise the defendant of the following things:
The nature of the charge
The potential penalties which might result from the plea, including any mandatory minimum sentence
The defendant's rights to not plead guilty, and to request a jury trial.
The court must ask the defendant if he understands each of these points, and must receive a voluntary affirmative response. Many courts use a script of the questions which the judge will ask the defendant and the defense attorney in a specific order. Failure by the court to advise the defendant of any of the above points will supply the grounds for a collateral attack on the plea; if such an attack is successful, the guilty plea will be withdrawn, and the defendant will be given the opportunity to enter a new plea. The court can accept and bind the defendant to a guilty plea, even if the defendant insists that he is innocent, and merely taking the plea to avoid conviction by a jury.

Pursuant to the Sixth Amendment to the U.S. Constitution, a criminal defendant has the right to be represented by an attorney during a plea colloquy; failure of the state to provide an attorney to an indigent defendant during such proceedings is grounds for an appeal. It is possible - but very difficult - for a defendant who is so represented to have a plea thrown out due to ineffective assistance of counsel. The defendant must make a positive showing that but for the erroneous advice of counsel, he would not have chosen to plead guilty.

References

External links
A scripted plea colloquy from a U.S. magistrate court

Criminal procedure